Heinz van Haaren (born 3 June 1940 in Marl, Province of Westphalia) is a Dutch former football midfielder.

References

External links
 
 

1940 births
Living people
People from Marl, North Rhine-Westphalia
Sportspeople from Münster (region)
Dutch expatriate footballers
Expatriate footballers in France
Expatriate footballers in Germany
Dutch footballers
Association football midfielders
People from the Province of Westphalia
MSV Duisburg players
FC Schalke 04 players
RC Strasbourg Alsace players
Ligue 1 players
Bundesliga players
TSV Marl-Hüls players
Footballers from North Rhine-Westphalia